Noor Hossain (also rendered as Nur Hossain; ; 1961 – November 10, 1987) was a Bangladeshi activist who was killed by the Bangladesh Police on November 10, 1987, while protesting against President Hussain Muhammad Ershad near Zero Point in Dhaka, Bangladesh. Zero Point was later renamed Noor Hossain Square and the anniversary of his death is officially commemorated each year as Shohid Noor Hossain Day. He is one of the most widely known martyrs of Bangladesh's pro-democracy movement.

Early life 
Hossain's ancestral home on his father's side was in the village of Jhatibunia, which is located in Mathbaria Upazila, Pirojpur District. His father, Mujibur Rahman was an autorickshaw operator. His family moved to 79/1 Banagram Road, Dhaka after the Bangladesh Liberation War in 1971. Noor Hossain attended Radhasundari Primary School, which was also on Banagram Road. When he was in 8th grade at Graduate High School, Dhaka, Hossain quit school because of poverty. He was admitted to a motor driving school and received training in driving like his father. Interested in politics, Hossain became the publicity secretary of the Banagram unit committee of Dhaka City Joubo League. He was neither well-off nor highly educated but he embodied the struggle of common people of the country, and has become a public symbol.

Dhaka Siege

On November 10, 1987, political opponents came together for what they called a "Dhaka Siege" (Dhaka Blockade) to demand an end to the rule of President Hussain Muhammad Ershad based on violations of democracy. Although he had been in power since 1982 through a coup d'état, he won the October 1987 election, but opponents charged it was a fraud. The Awami League and Bangladesh National Party united in opposition against Ershad's rule. One opposition demand was an election of the National Assembly under a non-partisan caretaker government. The rally turned violent, and several leaders and protesters including Noor Hossain were killed in riot conditions; several hundred were also injured. Noor Hossain was among three Jubo League members killed at a protest rally. The other two were leaders Nurul Huda Babul and Aminul Huda Tito. In the aftermath, the opposition called for a nationwide protest strike on November 11 and 12.

Hossain is now associated in Bangladesh with anti-autocracy and pro-democracy. At the time he was shot, his body carried several slogans in white paint. He wore the slogan "Down with autocracy" (Sairachar nipat jak) on his chest, and on his back, he had written the slogan "Let Democracy Be Free" (Ganatantra mukti pak). His death raised the visibility of opposition sentiment directed against the Ershad government.

Ershad was removed from office on December 6, 1990 as a result of the mass movement that grew from the Dhaka Siege. After Ershad left office, Khaleda Zia of the BNP was elected as Bangladesh's first female prime minister, and a year later the government established a national date to commemorate the event. It was first called the "Historic November 10 observance", but the Awami League supported the name "Noor Hossain Day" by which it is known today. Ershad's Jatiya Party became part of the Awami League coalition after his removal, and Ershad later apologised for Hossain's death. The Jatiya Party does commemorate the day but refers to it as "Democracy Day" (Bengali: Ganatantra Dibash).

Noor Hossain and the square remained significant for protesters after Hossain's death in 1987 and Ershad's removal in 1990. In 1993, the Awami League led protesters to the square on the occasion of the November 10 anniversary against the BNP government, which also provoked a reaction from the police.

In 1996, Ershad officially apologised for Hossain's death before parliament and also to Hossain's father. Ershad maintained his apology but also criticised the opposition for using Hossain as a symbol against his government. In 2012, he said, "You (the opposition) came up with dead bodies as they were needed to spark demonstrations."

Accounts and reactions

Prime Minister Sheikh Hasina has given her own account of Hossain's death: "I remember what happened on that day. Noor Hossain was standing beside me when we took out our procession. I called him and told him they would kill him for what he had inscribed on his chest. Then he brought his head near the window of my car and said, 'Sister, you just bless me. I will sacrifice my life to free democracy."

Hasina also said, "Bangladesh got back the rights to vote and food in exchange of Shaheed Nur Hossain’s supreme sacrifice."

Marium Bibi, Hossain's mother, has most recently said, "I still don’t see anything for which my son died." In an earlier interview, she said, "It is hard for any mother to lose her son. But I have no sorrows... I am proud of Noor."

In popular culture
The event of his death is honoured each year as cultural and political organisations sponsor special programs for observance the day. The day is officially commemorated as Shohid Noor Hossain Day in Bangladesh.

Photographs of Noor Hossain wearing slogans on his chest taken by Dinu Alam and back taken by Pavel Rahaman were taken shortly before his death and become an important visual icon in Bangladesh representing the struggle for democracy.

A postage stamp was issued by Bangladesh in honour of his martyrdom.

Hossain is the subject of the Bengali film Buk tar Bangladesher hridoy.

A fictional character named "Nur Hossain" appears in Neamat Imam's novel The Black Coat.

Gallery

Notes

References

Further reading 
 Noor Hossain and the image that helped bring down a dictator by BBC.
 নূর হোসেন : এরশাদ বিরোধী মিছিলে বুকে-পিঠে শ্লোগান লেখা বিক্ষোভকারীর সেই ছবির নেপথ্য কাহিনী By BBC News Bangla.

External links

 

1961 births
1987 deaths
1987 in Bangladesh
Bangladeshi democracy activists
Deaths by firearm in Bangladesh
People shot dead by law enforcement officers
Protest-related deaths